North Carolina Highway 211 (NC 211) is a  primary state highway in the U.S. state of North Carolina.  It traverses mostly through the Sandhills and Coastal Plain regions of the state; connecting the cities of Candor, Aberdeen, Raeford, Lumberton, Bladenboro, and Southport.

Route description
Its southern terminus is at US 421, via the Fort Fisher Ferry Terminal, in Fort Fisher. Crossing the Cape Fear River on the Fisher-Southport Ferry, travelers enter the town of Southport; where the highway first goes through the downtown area before begins its northwesterly direction to Supply, where it connects with US 17.

Now going on an almost due north direction, it passes through the Green Swamp Preserve, reaching the town of Bolton, where it connects with US 74 and US 76.  This section of highway may one day be paralleled by a future segment of I-74.

Returning to a north-westerly direction, it goes through Clarkton (connecting with US 701) and makes a bypass north of Bladenboro before reaching the biggest city along its route, Lumberton.  In Lumberton, it follows Roberts Avenue, as it bypasses the downtown area; at the north-end of Lumberton, it connects with I-95/US 301.

North of Red Springs, the highway designations change from north–south to east–west direction; though it continues to go on an almost northerly route through Raeford (connecting with US 401), passing along the western edge of Fort Bragg, and Aberdeen (connecting with US 1/US 15/US 501), until it reaches the Pinehurst traffic circle in Pinehurst.  After the traffic circle, NC 211 goes on a more westerly direction, it traverses through West End and Eagle Springs, before ending at its western terminus in Candor (connecting with I-73/I-74/US 220).

History

Established in 1921 as an original state highway, traversing from NC 23 (today US 701 Bus), in Clarkton, to NC 20 (today NC 72), in Lumberton.  In 1930, it was extended south as a new primary routing to US 17/NC 20 (today NC 214), in Bolton.  In 1932, it extended north as a new primary routing to NC 70 (today NC 72), in Red Springs.  By 1935, its northern terminus was extended again to Aberdeen, replacing NC 70.  In 1940, its third northern extension was made, overlapping with US 15/US 501 through Aberdeen, then replacing NC 2 to its current terminus in Candor.

In the late 1940s, NC 211's route was realigned from Main Street to South Street, in Aberdeen; some of the former routing became part of NC 5.  During the early 1950s, NC 211 made a fourth extension north in Candor, replacing US 220 on Pack House Road; this lasted until June, 1963 where it was moved back to its former and current northern terminus.

In the mid-1950s, NC 211 made the following adjustments: at Eagle Springs, it was placed on new construction bypassing north of the community, its old alignment becoming Eagle Springs Road (SR 1138).  In Bolton, it was removed from Old 211 (SR 1805) and extended south on new primary routing to US 17/NC 130, in Supply.  And in Lumberton, it was moved onto its current alignment on Roberts Avenue, its old alignment becoming NC 211A (later becoming NC 211 Business).

In 1957, NC 211 was extended south, overlapping with NC 130, into Southport (at Moore Street). Between 1958-1962, various alignment changes were made along the route at Antioch and Seven Lakes.  Also around 1961, NC 211 was rerouted with US 15/US 501 between Aberdeen and Pinehurst to the roundabout, then onto new primary routing that avoided central Pinehurst; the old alignment became part of NC 5.  In 1969, NC 211 was placed on new routing west of the McCain community, leaving Old NC 211 (SR 1318).

In 1972, NC 211 was placed on new alignment north between Butters and Bladenboro, the old alignment became secondary road (SR 1134).  In 1975, more of NC 211 was placed on new alignment north and east of Bladenboro, its old alignment through town becoming NC 211 Business (which also incorporated the former section displaced in 1972).

Around 1990,  NC 211 was extended to its current southern terminus at the Southport Ferry Terminal, after upgrades were made on Moore Street and Ferry Road.  On June 6, 2013,  NC 211 was extended east over the Cape Fear River, via the Fort Fisher-Southport Ferry, to Fort Fisher and US 421.  Justification for the change was to have the highway end at another primary route and to incorporate the ferry route into a marine highway, which will expedite dredging operations in emergency situations.

Future
NC DOT will undertake a  major project in 2019 to widen NC 211 into a divided, four-lane highway from Midway Road (NC 906) to NC 87 in Southport. Involving roughly 7 miles of roadway, the project entails constructing overpasses at Long Beach Road Extension and Midway Road/Middleton Boulevard and replacing bridges at Dutchman’s Creek and the Duke Energy Progress discharge canal.  The road  will remain open during  construction which is expected to cost $85-million and take some four years. 
Further inland, widening of NC 211 between Holly Grove School Rd. and NC 73 in Moore County will begin in 2020 so as to be completed in time for the 2024 USGA Open scheduled to be held that year in Pinehurst.

Junction list

Special routes

Lumberton alternate spur

North Carolina Highway 211 Alternate (NC 211A) was established by 1949 as a spur route that connected with US 301 (Pine Street) with mainline NC 211 (Elm Street) along 24th Street.  In 1957, the alternate route was decommissioned when NC 211 was bypassed north of Lumberton.

Lumberton alternate route

North Carolina Highway 211 Alternate (NC 211A) was established by 1957 as a renumbering of mainline NC 211 through downtown Lumberton; via Fifth Street, Second Street, Chestnut Street, and Elm Street.  In 1960, it was redesignated as NC 211 Business.

Lumberton business loop

North Carolina Highway 211 Business (NC 211 Bus) was established in 1960 as a renumbering of NC 211A, which traversed along the old NC 211 route through downtown Lumberton; via Fifth Street, Second Street, Chestnut Street, and Elm Street.  On April 1, 1971, the route was decommissioned, reverting all to secondary routes; in 1983, NC 72 was reassigned onto Fifth and Second streets.

Bladenboro business loop

North Carolina Highway 211 Business (NC 211 Bus) was established in 1975 as a renumbering of mainline NC 211 through downtown Bladenboro, via Martin Luther King Jr Drive and Seaboard Street.

See also
 North Carolina Bicycle Route 3 - Concurrent with NC 211 from its southern terminus to Supply

References

External links

NCRoads.com: N.C. 211

211
Transportation in New Hanover County, North Carolina
Transportation in Brunswick County, North Carolina
Transportation in Columbus County, North Carolina
Transportation in Bladen County, North Carolina
Transportation in Robeson County, North Carolina
Transportation in Hoke County, North Carolina
Transportation in Moore County, North Carolina
Transportation in Montgomery County, North Carolina